William Evetts (30 June 1847 – 7 April 1936) was an English first-class cricketer.

The son of William Evetts senior, he was born in June 1847 at Tackley, Oxfordshire. He was educated at Harrow School, before going up to Brasenose College, Oxford. While studying at Oxford, Evetts played first-class cricket for Oxford University in 1868 and 1869, making nine appearances. A free hitting batsman, he scored 333 runs for Oxford at an average of 23.78, with a high score of 102. His 102 came against Surrey at The Oval in 1868 and was made in under two hours. Shortly after graduating from Oxford, Evetts appeared for the Marylebone Cricket Club (MCC) in first-class cricket in 1870. He played first-class cricket for the MCC until 1882, making thirteen appearances and scoring 198 runs with a high score of 57. Evetts was by profession a farmer. He died at Tackley in April 1936. His grandson, Julian Evetts, was also a first-class cricketer.

References

External links

1847 births
1936 deaths
People from West Oxfordshire District
People educated at Harrow School
Alumni of Brasenose College, Oxford
English cricketers
Oxford University cricketers
Marylebone Cricket Club cricketers
English farmers
English cricketers of 1864 to 1889